The VVER-TOI or WWER-TOI is a generation III+ nuclear power reactor based on VVER technology developed by Rosatom. 
The VVER-TOI design is intended to improve the competitiveness of Russian VVER technology in international markets.
It would use VVER-1300/510 water pressurized reactors constructed to meet modern nuclear and radiation safety requirements.

The VVER-TOI project is developed on the basis of the design documents worked out for AES-2006, considering the experience gained in development of projects based on VVER technology both in Russia and abroad, such as Novovoronezh Nuclear Power Plant II. The first VVER-TOI will be unit 1 of the Kursk II Nuclear Power Plant.

Main technical-economic indicators 
The reactor design life is 60 years, with potential of life extension to 100 years, and a thermal capacity of 3300 MWt and a gross electrical capacity of 1300 MWe.

Project initial requirements 
 Stability in the terms of critical external impacts and natural disasters.
 Correspondence to the world accepted rules and regulations.
 Correspondence to the climatic conditions from the tropics up to Northern regions.
 Independence in the terms of external power and water supply sources loss.

Safety assurance principles

Population and environment protection 
The radiation safety is arranged and implemented to prevent inadmissible impacts caused by ionizing radiation sources on the materials, population and environment in the area that surrounds a Nuclear power plant.

The concept of providing radiation and nuclear safety in VVER-TOI project is based on the following:
 requirements provided by domestic safety rules and regulations in force in the field of nuclear-power engineering, which are applicable for the designed power unit considering their further development;
 modern philosophy and safety principles developed by the world nuclear community and reflected in the IAEA Safety Standards;
 materials published by International Nuclear Safety Advisory Group (INSAG) on nuclear safety issues, EUR requirements;
 complex of the technical solutions worked-out and checked through operation considering the efforts targeted at their upgrading, and elimination of the “weak links” revealed during operation;
 verified and certified calculation methods, codes and programs; worked-out safety analysis methodology, reliable database;
 organizational and technical measures to prevent and restrict severe accidents repercussions, which are developed according to the results of investigations in the field of severe accidents;
 experience in development of new generation and increased safety plants;
 to provide low sensibility to the errors and personnel mistaken solutions;
 to ensure low risks of considerable radionuclide emission in case of accident;
 to provide possibility of exercising safety functions without external power supply, as well as making control through “human–machine” interface;
 to ensure conditions required to avoid evacuation of the population living near a Nuclear power plant in case of severe accidents.

Safety barriers 
VVER-TOI project shows implementation of the following principles ensuring the modern concept of the repetitive defense in depth:
 to create a number of the consequential barriers preventing emission of the radioactive products, which are accumulated during operation to environment. Nuclear fuel (fuel matrix and fuel-element cladding), boundaries of the coolant circuit, cooling reactor core (reactor vessel, pressurizers, main circulating pumps, steam generator collectors, primary circuit pipelines and connected systems, heat-exchanging steam generator tubes), hermetic fences of the premises with located equipment and reactor plant pipelines inside can serve as the barriers for Nuclear power plants with VVER reactors.
 high level of reliability caused by implementation of the special requirements to quality assurance and control while designing, manufacturing, installation, keeping the level achieved during operation through control and diagnostics (ceaseless or periodical) of physical barriers conditions, elimination of the revealed defects, damages and failures;
 to establish protective and localizing systems intended for prevention of the physical barriers damage, restriction or mitigation of the radiation repercussions in case of possible infringement of normal operation margins and conditions, and in case of accidents.

Nuclear power plant protection against external impacts 
Natural disasters and human-induced impacts specifying site conditions are accepted taking into account possibility of constructing Nuclear power plants with VVER-TOI reactors in various geographical regions, as well as in the regions characterized by different human-induced impacts.

The most important impacts, which parameters affected significantly technical solutions on VVER-TOI project are listed below:
 Seismic impacts
 Impacts connected with aircraft crashes
 Air impact waves
 Floods and storms
 Tornadoes
Nuclear power plant systems and components as a part of the base - case project are developed by reference to the following natural disasters and design human-induced impacts:
 Safe Shutdown earthquake of intensity up to 8 on MSK-64 scale at maximum horizontal acceleration on a free ground surface of 0.25 g
 Design-Basis earthquake of intensity up to 7 on MSK-64 scale at maximum horizontal acceleration on a free ground surface of 0.12 g
 Crash of a 20 t aircraft at a speed of 215 m/s as design initial event
 Crash of a 400 t heavy aircraft at a speed of 150 m/s as beyond design initial event considering fuel fire; to cope with this event the design provides prevention of radionuclide release to environment
 Air impact wave at a pressure of 30 kPa and duration of the compression phase up to 1 s
 Wind maximum design speed up to 56 m/s

Severe accidents control 
Modern Nuclear power plants are characterized by the unprecedented low risk of ionizing radiation propagation and radionuclide emission to environment. This result is achieved through the newest protective and localizing technologies of the safety system. The VVER-TOI project shows, as a basis variant, the configuration based on the two channel structure of active safety systems without internal backup, and four channel structure of passive safety systems. The passive safety system provides a 72 hour period requiring no operator intervention.

The profile of the active safety systems is as follows:
 System of fuel pool emergency and planned cooling down and cooling;
 emergency boron injection system;
 steam generator emergency cooling down system;
 Emergency power supply system (diesel-generator set).

The profile of the passive safety systems is as follows:
 passive part of the core emergency cooling system;
 passive core-flooding system;
 water supply system from the fuel pond to primary circuit;
 system of passive heat removal from steam generator;
 primary circuit protection against overpressure;
 secondary circuit protection against overpressure;
 fast-acting pressure reducing station;
 emergency gas-removal system;
 emergency power supply system (accumulators);
 passive system of inner shell leakages filtration.

The accident control facility of the VVER-TOI project includes a core catcher, which provides the guaranteed safety control through melt localizing and cooling in case of a severe accident at the beyond-vessel stage of core-melt localization. Within the frame of VVER-TOI, there are performed the works directed toward optimization of technical solutions made for corium trap project to decrease cost indicators and justify the corium trap operation efficiency. It is supposed to achieve a considerable decrease in the trap vessel overall sizes and sacrificed materials weight, as well as to transfer to module design of the trap vessel that make it possible to simplify transportation of the large-sized equipment to the construction site of a Nuclear power plant.

Combination of passive and active safety systems provided for in the VVER-TOI project ensures that core will not be destroyed for not less than 72 hours from the moment of severe accident happening in case of any possible scenario. The corresponding technical solutions guarantee that reactor plant will be transferred to safe conditions at any combination of initial events (natural and human-induced) triggering to loss of all the electric power sources. This fact increases considerably the project competitiveness both in foreign and domestic markets of electric power production.

Framatome is supplying reactor protection systems for the VVER-TOI reactors at Kursk II.

Project key features

Lifetime extension 
The VVER-TOI reactor pressure vessel has fewer welds than the VVER-1200, all out of the central area, and a more symmetric arrangement of coolant nozzles. This gives the potential for two 20 year life extensions, which could give a 100 year life.

Typical project 
VVER-TOI is a basis for the development of Nuclear power plant serial construction projects at the sites located within a wide range of natural-climatic conditions, considering the whole spectrum of internal extreme and external human-induced impacts, which are specific for all eventual construction sites. The project is developed to the intent that its application in individual Nuclear power plant projects would not require change of the main conceptual, engineering and layout solutions, as well as additional safety analysis and other justifying documents to be submitted to the state supervisory authorities for receiving construction licenses.

Innovative designing technologies 
 United information space is a multi-platform software and hardware complex intended for control of the engineering data for engineering, designing, as well as arranging communication between territorially-distanced project participants.
 An expanded functional analysis (based on the detail application of IAEA standards) is the practical basis to specify an assignment for automatic performance of nuclear technological processes, designing organization-functional operation structure, and grounded calculation of normal-mode ratio.
 MultiD-designing serves as a developed “field-engineering” experience that considerably increases possibility of the project controlling through detail working-out the process solutions on construction and equipment installation.

Upgrading possibility 
VVER-TOI power unit circuits, equipment, systems and structures design make it possible to upgrade it allowing for:
 increase annual electric power production (e.g. by ICUF increasing, scheduled and unplanned downtime reduction);
 decrease auxiliary power consumption;
 decrease electric and thermal power losses;
 improve personnel working conditions;
 keep a proper safety level following to toughening requirements provided by regulatory documents and necessity to receive operation permits on a periodical basis during Nuclear power plant design service life.

Virtual Prototyping Center 
Virtual Prototyping Center is a complex of soft-and-hardware facilities making it possible to visualize design and engineering models. It represents a  sphere, in which center attendance being at  height at a transparent glass platform can see 3D-format picture. It allows everyone to go into virtual worlds.

The complex practical use includes the following:
 Nuclear power plant model interactive control;
 planning and design solutions analysis;
 working-out the Nuclear power plant's operation, maintenance and repair;
 simulation of the actions to be undertaken in case of emergencies;
 to be used as a testing-area for Crisis Management Center.

At the present moment there are no analogous technical implementations in Russia while designing complicated technological objects. This demonstration method is used only by defense industry, large automobile corporations and aircraft engineering companies.

Deadlines of the project implementation 
2009:
 On July 22, 2009 the President Committee for upgrading and development of the Russian economy made a decision on starting the project for development of nuclear technologies in reactor plant within the frame of short-term priority;
 Stage of commencement of the works under the project.
2010:
 Nuclear island and VVER-TOI power unit conceptual model;
 Establishment of the organization being a holder of the base technology provided with modern design and engineering facilities.
2011:
 3D-design of nuclear island and VVER-TOI power unit;
 Safety justifying calculations.
2012:
 MultiD-project of Nuclear power plant with a VVER-TOI reactor;
 Preparation of a package of the updated normative technical documents to provide usage of new design and construction technologies in the project.
The project was realized in 2009 and completed in 2012.

Construction 
The first VVER-TOI construction began in April 2018 at the Kursk Nuclear Power Plant, with a predicted completion date of late 2022.

In addition, there are an additional 11 VVER-TOI units planned.

References

External links 
 www.rosatom.ru
 www.rosenergoatom.ru
 www.i-russia.ru
 www.aep.ru
 www.niaep.ru

Nuclear power reactor types
Proposed nuclear power stations
Nuclear technology in Russia
Pressurized water reactors